Thomas Duncan Grimmer (March 27, 1828 – September 8, 1893) was a member of the Wisconsin State Assembly.

Biography
Grimmer was born on March 27, 1828, in Charlotte County, New Brunswick, sources have differed on the exact location. He married Frances C. Cook on December 21, 1857.

Career
Grimmer was a member of the Assembly in 1872. He was a Republican.

References

Colony of New Brunswick people
Republican Party members of the Wisconsin State Assembly
1828 births
1893 deaths
Pre-Confederation Canadian emigrants to the United States
19th-century American politicians